Prajwal Devaraj (born 4 July 1987) is an Indian actor who mainly works in Kannada cinema. He made his debut with the Kannada film Sixer (2007) for which he won the Best Debut actor award at the Suvarna Film Awards. This was followed by the gangster drama Geleya (2007) which was a box-office success. Prajwal has been appreciated for his recent films like Chowka (2017), Gentleman (2020) and Inspector Vikram (2021).

His films include Meravanige (2008), Gulama (2009), Murali Meets Meera (2011), Super Shastri (2013) and Galaate (2013).

Early life
Prajwal is the son of Kannada actor Devaraj. He has a younger brother, Pranam.

Education
Prajwal completed his bachelor's degree course at Jain University's Center for Management Studies in Bangalore.

Filmography

Cameo Appearances 

Awards

Television

References

External links
 
 Prajwal Biography

1987 births
Male actors in Kannada cinema
Living people
Kannada people
Indian male film actors
Male actors from Bangalore
21st-century Indian male actors